Euan McLeod JP, is a member of the Scottish Labour Party and a former councillor in the Glasgow City Council for Ward 19, Shettleston. He was appointed Councillor on 11 May 2003 and served until 2012.

Committee membership 
McLeod served on numerous committees as a Councillor, among them are:
 Policy and Resources (Environmental Sustainability)
 Policy and Resources (Community Planning)
 Policy and Resources (Information and Communications Technology)
 Cultural and Leisure Services
 East Area
 Environmental Protection Services
 Parks and Facilities
 Cultural and Leisure Services (Grants)
 Development and Regeneration Services (Development Applications)
 Land and Environment Policy Development and Scrutiny Committee
 Convener Shettleston Area Committee

Outside Bodies 
Aside from his Councillor duties, McLeod is associated with other groups, such as:
 Authorities Buying Consortium (ABC
 Glasgow Housing Association
 Kelvin Clyde Greenspace Area Partnership
 Zoological Society of Glasgow & West of Scotland
 7:84 Theatre Company
 City Building (Glasgow) LLP Licensing Board
 Nuclear Free Local Authorities (NFLA) National Steering Group
 Nuclear Free Local Authorities (NFLA) Scotland
 Shettleston, Baillieston & Greater Easterhouse Local Housing Forum

References

Living people
Scottish Labour councillors
Councillors in Glasgow
Year of birth missing (living people)